Brinkley is a locality and former township in South Australia west of the Murray River and approximately  south west by road from the centre of Murray Bridge. Its boundaries for the long-established locality were formalised in March 2000. It is named for the cadastral division in which it lies, the Hundred of Brinkley, which itself was named after Captain M. Brinkley who in 1860 was the clerk of the state's Executive Council.

Hundred of Brinkley
The Hundred of Brinkley is larger than the modern locality boundaries. It includes all or most of the localities and towns:

See also
 List of cities and towns in South Australia

References

Towns in South Australia